Johan Andersson (born 15 June 1995) is a Swedish football player who plays as a right-back.

Honours

Club
Djurgården
Allsvenskan: 2019

References

External links
 

1995 births
Living people
Allsvenskan players
Superettan players
Ettan Fotboll players
Djurgårdens IF Fotboll players
IK Sirius Fotboll players
Karlstad BK players
GIF Sundsvall players
Swedish footballers
Sweden youth international footballers
Footballers from Uppsala
Association football defenders